Westerhever is a municipality in Nordfriesland in the German state of Schleswig-Holstein.

Geography
Westerhever lies on the northwestern tip of the Eiderstedt Peninsula.  The Westerheversand Lighthouse is a major landmark on the peninsula which is surrounded by salt marshes. The saltmarshes, lighthouse, and beaches attract about 80,000 visitors every year.

History
The island Westerhever was first settled by humans in the 12th Century.  The first humans there built a ring dike to protect the land.

References

External links

Municipalities in Schleswig-Holstein
Nordfriesland